Mary Hill may refer to:

People
 Mary Hill, Countess of Hillsborough (1725/26–1780). British peeress, daughter of the 4th Baron Stawell
 Mary C. Hill, American hydrologist
 Mary Elliott Hill (1907–1969), African-American chemist
 Mary Hill, Marchioness of Downshire (1764–1836), landowner and politician, wife of Arthur Hill, 2nd Marquess of Downshire
 Lady Mary Hill (1796–1830), daughter of Arthur Hill, 2nd Marquess of Downshire
 Lady Mary Penelope Hill (1817–1884), daughter of Arthur Hill, 3rd Marquess of Downshire, wife of Alexander Hood, 1st Viscount Bridport
 Elizabeth Hill (swimmer) (Mary Elizabeth Hill, born 1985), American swimmer

Places
 Mary Hill, British Columbia, a neighbourhood in Port Coquitlam, British Columbia, Canada
 Mary Hill Bypass, another name for British Columbia Highway 7B, Canada
 Mary Hill, Iowa, an unincorporated community, United States

See also
 Hell Mary Hill, a hill near Sheffield, England, United Kingdom
 Mary Hill Convent, convent in Karnataka, India
 Maryhill (disambiguation)
 Hill (surname)
 

Hill, Mary